Michel Saidi is a former French slalom canoeist who competed from the early 1980s to the early 1990s.

He won three medals in the C2 team event at the ICF Canoe Slalom World Championships with two golds (1987, 1989) and a silver (1985). He won all of these medals partnering Jérôme Daval.

World Cup individual podiums

References
Overview of athlete's results at canoeslalom.net

French male canoeists
Living people
Year of birth missing (living people)
Medalists at the ICF Canoe Slalom World Championships